Dimedone is an organic compound with the formula . Classified as a cyclic diketone, it is a derivative of 1,3-cyclohexanedione. It is a white solid that is soluble in water, as well as ethanol and methanol. It once was used as a reagent to test for the aldehyde functional group.

Synthesis 
Dimedone is prepared from mesityl oxide and diethyl malonate.

Chemical properties

Tautomerism 
Dimedone is in equilibrium with its tautomer in solution — in a 2:1 keto to enol ratio in chloroform.

Crystalline dimedone contains chains of molecules, in the enol form, linked by hydrogen bonds:

Reaction with aldehydes 
Dimedone reacts with aldehydes to give crystalline derivatives, whose melting points can be used to distinguish between aldehydes.

References

Diketones
3-Hydroxypropenals